Jateorhiza is a plant genus in the family Menispermaceae.

Species
The Plant List recognises 2 accepted species:

 Jateorhiza macrantha  
 Jateorhiza palmata

References 

Menispermaceae
Menispermaceae genera